Josep Franch is the name of:

Josep Franch (basketball) (born 1991), Spanish basketball player
Josep Franch (footballer) (1943–2021), Spanish footballer